San Antonio de Padua is a village in Vigía del Fuerte Municipality, Antioquia Department in Colombia. It is surrounded by a dense tropical rainforest.

Climate
San Antonio de Padua has a very wet tropical rainforest climate (Af). It is the wettest place in the department of Antioquia.

References

Populated places in the Antioquia Department